Lieinix cinerascens, the bluish mimic-white, is a butterfly in the family Pieridae. It is found in Costa Rica and Panama.

References

Dismorphiinae
Butterflies described in 1871
Taxa named by Osbert Salvin
Butterflies of Central America